A pissing contest, pissing duel, or pissing match, is a game in which participants compete to see who can urinate the highest, the farthest, for the longest, or the most accurately. Although the practice is usually associated with adolescent boys, women have been known to play the game, and there are literary depictions of adults competing in it. Since the 1940s, the term has been used as a slang idiomatic phrase describing contests that are "futile or purposeless", especially if waged in a "conspicuously aggressive manner". As a metaphor it is used figuratively to characterise futile ego-driven battling in a pejorative or facetious manner that is often considered vulgar. The image of two people urinating on each other has also been offered as a source of the phrase.

Etymology
The Oxford English Dictionary (OED) defines a pissing contest as "a competition to see who can urinate the farthest or highest" and (in extended use) as "any contest which is futile or purposeless especially ones pursued in a conspicuously aggressive manner." The first cited use of the phrase comes from a 1943 Study and Investigation of Federal Communications Committee hearing before the U.S. House Select Committee to Investigate F.C.C. where a politician was quoted as saying: "You boys have to understand … that I have to deal with a combination like that of Hartley-David; it is like having a pissing contest with a skunk." The OED's first citation of pissing match is from a December 1971 Washington Post story that says
"One Western diplomat ... discounting the significance of the Sino-Soviet arguments ... described it as 'a pissing match, and I'm glad not to be caught in the crossfire.

Urban Dictionary's crowdsourced definition describes the term as being used figuratively "to refer to a meaningless though nonetheless entertaining act in which people try to outdo one another in any way." Comments found there also describe pissing contests as literal competition "in which two or more people, usually (but not exclusively) male, urinate with the intention of producing the stream with the greatest distance." The New Partridge Dictionary of Slang and Unconventional English separates its definition of "pissing match" (a conflict involving "unpleasantries") from "pissing contest" (a conflict with negative attacks made by both sides). For "pissing contest" it offers a different image from other reference works: "From the graphic if vulgar image of two men urinating on each other". Both phrases are said to originate in the United States.

Female world record
Pissing contests usually, but not always, take place between males. Kacie T. H., in her book All is fair in pissing contests, describes a female pissing contest that she witnessed in Italy back in 2018, supposedly documented by Guinness World Records. This resulted in a record 30 foot arc, beating previous male records.

Havelock Ellis, in his book Studies in the Psychology of Sex, describes a female pissing contest in Belgium, in which two women each stood over a bottle with a funnel and urinated into it, the winner being the one who most nearly filled the bottle. Women can, once they have learned the right technique, urinate standing. A comic song from 17th-century Belgium is about a similar contest, aiming into a shoe, between three women seeking to impress a man.

There is also early Irish literature about  female pissing contests. In the story "Aided Derbforgaill" several women compete to see who can urinate deepest into a pile of snow. The winner is Derbforgaill, wife of Lugaid Riab nDerg, but the other women attack her out of jealousy and mutilate her by gouging out her eyes and cutting off her nose, ears, and hair, resulting in her death. Her husband Lugaid also dies, from grief, and Cú Chulainn avenges the deaths by demolishing a house with the women inside, killing 150.

In the animal kingdom

Pissing contests are not unique to humans. Trevor Corson's The Secret Life of Lobsters describes a pissing match between lobsters:

Metaphorical phrase
Dwight Eisenhower is reported to have said of Senator Joseph McCarthy that he wouldn't "get into a pissing contest with that skunk." Eisenhower's secretary of state, John Foster Dulles, used the same phrase in 1958 when asked why he had not responded to a statement by the French foreign minister that the French government had not been consulted about a crisis in Lebanon.

The dispute between Carl Icahn and Yahoo! was described as pissing contest. A review of American novelist John Barth's work described it as "resolutely postmodern" in approach and criticised it with a statement that: "Prolonged exposure to this particular 'pissing contest' just left me wanting to tell Barth to parse off".  Steven Pinker's The Stuff of Thought: Language as a Window to Human Nature credits the "wordsmiths who thought up the indispensable pissing contest" and other crass phrases such as crock of shit, pussy-whipped, and horse's ass.

The Hippie Dictionary, a fringe counterculture publication, described the arms race between the U.S. and the U.S.S.R. as a pissing contest in which each country developed bigger and more powerful weapons until "each super power could obliterate the other multiple times over as well along with the rest of the world" and that "the term super power did not refer to intelligence".

In popular culture
Alexander Pope included a pissing contest as part of the duncely games in Book 2 of The Dunciad (1728), with the winner awarded the female poet Eliza Haywood and a china chamber pot to the runner-up.

A pissing contest takes place between two characters of the novel War of the Buttons.

A literal pissing contest and territorial marking is also depicted in Carroll Ballard's 1983 adaptation of Farley Mowat's autobiographical novel Never Cry Wolf. In the movie Wolf there is a pissing contest between two competitors. During a figurative pissing contest with a sleazy rival, Jack Nicholson's character confronts him in a bathroom, shows him he has just taken his job, fires him, and then pees on his shoes saying, "I'm just marking my territory, and you got in the way". The competitor, played by James Spader, notes that he has "suede shoes" to which Nicholson replies "asparagus".

Director Steven Sebring's Patti Smith: Dream of Life (2008) captures Patti Smith in a "playful" pissing contest with Flea.

The Friars Club Encyclopedia of Jokes includes a story about a husband and wife who compete in a pissing contest.

Havelock Ellis, in his book Studies in the Psychology of Sex, describes a female pissing contest.

There is also early Irish literature about  female pissing contests. In the story "Aided Derbforgaill" several women compete to see who can urinate deepest into a pile of snow.

See also
 Battle of egos
 Narcissism

References
Notes

Bibliography

External links 

Urine
Figures of speech
English-language slang
Narcissism